The 2003 Pavel Roman Memorial was the 9th edition of an annual international ice dancing competition held in Olomouc, Czech Republic. The event was held between December 19 and 21, 2003. Ice dancers competed in the junior and novice levels.

Results

Junior

External links
 results

Pavel Roman Memorial, 2003
Pavel Roman Memorial